Skydive Chicago Airport is a privately owned, public use airport located four miles northeast of Ottawa, Illinois. The airport  is the centerpiece of the Skydive Chicago Resort. Camping, RV parking, and lodging are available, as is a bar, lounge, observation area, and café.

Facilities
The airport has one runway: runway 3/21 measures 4522 x 50 ft (1378 x 15 m) and is made of asphalt. No fuel is available at the airport.

The airport is centered around a skydiving business called the Skydive Chicago Resort. Divers are welcome to stay at the resort for prolonged periods in order to experience more skydiving than normal. Facilities supporting the resort include cabins, a camping and RV parking area, showers, laundry, a pro shop, and meeting facilities. The airport has played home to the US Skydiving National Championships as well as the 2016 World Championships of Skydiving.

Aircraft
For the 12-month period ending August 31, 2019, the airport had 27 aircraft operations per day, or about 10,000 per year. It consisted entirely of general aviation. For the same time period, there are four airplanes based on the field: 2 single-engine and 2 multi-engine.

References 

Airports in Illinois